Signet is a Kenyan subsidiary of the Kenyan Broadcasting Corporation (KBC) that broadcast and distribute the DTT signals on DVB-T2. It was first launched on 9 December 2009 by H.E. President Mwai Kibaki in Nairobi and its environs.

The channels included are: 
 Signet- KBC 1
 Signet- KTN
 Signet- KUTV Kenya
 Signet- NTV
 Signet- K24-(News television)
 Signet- Citizen TV
 Signet – Word Music TV (24 hour music)
 Signet- GBS TV
 Signet- QTV
 Signet- Edu TV (KIE TV)
 Signet- Bunge TV(parliamentary proceedings)
 Signet- Heritage TV
 Signet- 3 stones TV (A Kikuyu TV)
 Signet- Family TV (Gospel television)
 Signet- Sayare TV (gospel television)
 Signet- LVTV (lake Victoria TV)
 Signet- Gor TV
 Signet- Senate TV(parliamentary proceedings)
 Signet- Kass TV( Kalenjin TV)
 Signet- Kiss TV
 Signet- Express TV
 Signet- Aviation TV (gospel)
 Signet- Hope TV (gospel C.I.T.A.M)
 Signet- Revival Television (Gospel)
 Signet- Fountain Television
 Signet- Bazaar Television (about cars-sales and adverts)
 Signet- Dream Television
 Signet- Property Television(sell of houses real estate)
 Signet- TV10(music)
 Signet- Youth Television
Signet- Manifest Television
 Signet- Millennium/MBN(gospel)
 Signet- EATV
 Signet- UTV
 Signet- Kingdom(gospel)
 Signet- Adventist(gospel)
 Signet- Deliverance(gospel)
 Signet- GE TV(gospel)
 Signet- Joy Television(gospel) 
Signet- Y254
Signet- nyota tv

References

my Kenya tv 
kutv
ukweli tv 
aviation tv
NYOTA TV
MWANGAZA TV

Companies of Kenya
Mass media in Kenya